Freeman Register is a paralympic athlete from the United States competing mainly in category C6 sprint events.

Freeman competed in three Paralympics, at his first in 1992 he won a gold in the 4 × 100 m and 100m where he equalled the world record and also won bronze in the 200m.  At the 1996 Summer Paralympics he won a gold in the 200m, silver in the 4 × 100 m behind a new world record set by the Hong Kong quartet and bronze in the 100m.  His third and final games were in 2000 where he finished eighth in the final of the 100m, his only event at these games.

References

External links 
 

Paralympic track and field athletes of the United States
Athletes (track and field) at the 1992 Summer Paralympics
Athletes (track and field) at the 1996 Summer Paralympics
Athletes (track and field) at the 2000 Summer Paralympics
Paralympic gold medalists for the United States
Paralympic silver medalists for the United States
Paralympic bronze medalists for the United States
American male sprinters
Living people
Year of birth missing (living people)
Medalists at the 1992 Summer Paralympics
Medalists at the 1996 Summer Paralympics
Paralympic medalists in athletics (track and field)